David Mail (born 12 September 1962) is an English former professional footballer who played as a central defender.

Career
Born in Bristol, Mail played for Aston Villa between 1978 and 1982 without making a senior appearance for them. He later made 356 appearances in the Football League for Blackburn Rovers and Hull City, before playing non-league football for Brigg Town.

References

1962 births
Living people
English footballers
Aston Villa F.C. players
Blackburn Rovers F.C. players
Hull City A.F.C. players
Brigg Town F.C. players
English Football League players
Association football defenders